Dicolonus is a genus of robber flies in the family Asilidae. There are about five described species in Dicolonus.

Species
These five species belong to the genus Dicolonus:
 Dicolonus argentatus Matsumura, 1916 c g
 Dicolonus medius Adisoemarto and Wood, 1975 i c g
 Dicolonus nigricentrus Adisoemarto and Wood, 1975 i c g
 Dicolonus simplex Loew, 1866 i c g b
 Dicolonus sparsipilosus Back, 1909 i c g
Data sources: i = ITIS, c = Catalogue of Life, g = GBIF, b = Bugguide.net

References

Further reading

 
 
 

Asilidae
Articles created by Qbugbot
Asilidae genera